Pristan may refer to:

Pristan'-Przheval'sk, village in the Issyk Kul Province of Kyrgyzstan
Rudnaya Pristan, village at the mouth of the Rudnaya River on the Pacific coast of Primorsky Krai
Ust-Charyshskaya Pristan, village and administrative center of Ust-Pristansky District of Altai Krai, Russia
Pristan (air base), also known as Romanovka West, a former Soviet Naval airfield in Primorsky Krai